Ernesto Galán Íñigo (born 17 June 1986 in Madrid) is a Spanish professional footballer who plays for AD Villaviciosa de Odón. Mainly a right-back, he can also play as a central defender.

Honours
Rayo Vallecano
Segunda División: 2017–18

References

External links

1986 births
Living people
Spanish footballers
Footballers from Madrid
Association football defenders
La Liga players
Segunda División players
Segunda División B players
Tercera Federación players
CD Móstoles footballers
UE Lleida players
CD Puertollano footballers
RCD Espanyol footballers
Girona FC players
Xerez CD footballers
UD Las Palmas players
Deportivo Alavés players
CD Mirandés footballers
Rayo Vallecano players
CF Rayo Majadahonda players